The Léopoldville beaked snake (Letheobia praeocularis) is a species of snake in the Typhlopidae family. It is endemic to Africa.

References

Further reading
 Stejneger, L. 1894. Description of a new species of blind snakes (Typhlopidæ) from the Congo Free State. Proceedings of the United States National Museum. Volume XVI. 1893. pp. 709–710.

Letheobia
Reptiles described in 1894